Béliveau, occasionally spelled Beliveau or Belliveau, is a French-Canadian surname. Notable people with the surname include:

Cynthia Belliveau (born 1963), Canadian actress
Eugene Belliveau (born 1958), Canadian football defensive lineman
Jean Béliveau (1931–2014), Canadian ice-hockey player
Jeff Beliveau (born 1987), American baseball player
Juliette Béliveau (1889–1975), French-Canadian actress and singer
Sterling Belliveau (born 1953), Canadian politician
Véronique Béliveau (born 1955), Canadian actress and singer

See also
Collège Béliveau, college in Western Canada
Colisée Jean Béliveau, ice-hockey arena, named after Jean Béliveau
Jean Béliveau Trophy, ice-hockey review, named after Jean Béliveau

French-language surnames
Surnames of French origin